Roberto Zammarini (born 5 July 1996) is an Italian football player who plays for Pordenone.

Club career
He made his professional debut in the Lega Pro for Mantova on 30 August 2014 in a game against Alessandria.

On 9 January 2017, he joined Pisa.

On 31 January 2019, he joined Pordenone on loan for the second time.

On 13 August 2019, he joined Pordenone on his third loan until June 2020, with an option to purchase.

On 5 October 2020, he went to Pordenone on loan for the fourth time.

On 14 June 2021, Pordenone exercised their purchase option in the loan contract, Zammarini signed a three-year contract with the club.

References

External links
 

1996 births
People from Casalmaggiore
Living people
Italian footballers
Association football midfielders
Mantova 1911 players
Serie C players
Pisa S.C. players
Pordenone Calcio players
Serie B players
Sportspeople from the Province of Cremona
Footballers from Lombardy